Mary Ann Caws (born 1933) is an American author, translator, art historian and literary critic.

She is Distinguished Professor Emerita in Comparative Literature, English, and French at the Graduate School of the City University of New York, and on the film faculty. She is an expert on Surrealism and modern English and French literature, having written biographies of Marcel Proust, Virginia Woolf, and Henry James. She works on the interrelations of visual art and literary texts, has written biographies of Pablo Picasso and Salvador Dalí, and edited the diaries, letters, and source material of Joseph Cornell. She has also written on André Breton, Robert Desnos, René Char, Yves Bonnefoy, Robert Motherwell, and Edmond Jabès. She served as the senior editor for the HarperCollins World Reader, and edited anthologies including Manifesto: A Century of Isms, Surrealism, and the Yale Anthology of 20th-Century French Poetry. Among others, she has translated Stéphane Mallarmé, Tristan Tzara, Pierre Reverdy, André Breton, Paul Éluard, Robert Desnos, and René Char.

Among the positions she has held are President, Association for Study of Dada and Surrealism, 1971–75 and President, Modern Language Association of America, 1983, Academy of Literary Studies, 1984–85, and the American Comparative Literature Association, 1989-91.

She is a Fellow of the American Academy of Arts and Sciences, a Life Member of Clare Hall, Cambridge University, and a Fellow of the New York Institute for the Humanities.

In October 2004, she published her autobiography, To the Boathouse: a Memoir (University Alabama Press), and in November 2008, a cookbook memoir: Provençal Cooking: Savoring the Simple Life in France (Pegasus Books).

She was married to Peter Caws and is the mother of Hilary Caws-Elwitt and of Matthew Caws, lead singer of the band Nada Surf. She is married to Dr. Boyce Bennett; they live in New York City.

References

External links
 Mary Ann Caws official website

1933 births
Living people
Surrealism
Women art historians
Graduate Center, CUNY faculty
American women historians
American art historians
Presidents of the Modern Language Association